Poynter is an English surname.

Poynter may also refer to:
 Poynter Institute, an American journalism school
 Poynter Col, Antarctica
 Poynter Hill, Antarctica

See also 
 Pointer (disambiguation)